Lajas is a town and municipality of Puerto Rico located in the Lajas Valley in southwestern Puerto Rico, on the southern coast of the island, bordering the Caribbean Sea, south of San Germán and Sabana Grande; east of Cabo Rojo; and west of Guánica. Lajas is spread over 11 barrios plus Lajas Pueblo (the downtown area and the administrative center of the city). It is part of the San Germán-Cabo Rojo Metropolitan Statistical Area.

History
Located at the Lajas Valley, the town was founded in 1883 by the Xueta Teodoro Jacome Pagan. Xuetes (Chuetas) were Majorcan Jews (Sephardi Catalan Jews). Some families changed their names from Jacome to the Castilian form Santiago. Jacome is the Mallorquin form of James (Ia'akov). Catalan Jews from Majorca were part of the early settlers in the South of (Boriken) (Puerto Rico).

Puerto Rico was ceded by Spain in the aftermath of the Spanish–American War under the terms of the Treaty of Paris of 1898 and became a territory of the United States. In 1899, the United States Department of War conducted a census of Puerto Rico finding that the population of Lajas was 8,789.

The village of La Parguera is a popular tourist destination to see the famous Bahía Fosforescente (Phosphorescent Bay) and its numerous keys and islets. Parador La Parguera was founded by Puerto Rican comedian Henry LaFont (Julio Pancorbo Ortiz).

People from the El Combate community in barrio Boquerón are known as mata con hacha ("those who kill with axes") based on folklore about a fight over the salinas, where those from Cabo Rojo fought with axes against people from the adjacent town of Lajas. Because the people from Lajas apparently fought back by throwing stones they are known as tira piedras ("those who throw stones").

On September 20, 2017 Hurricane Maria struck Puerto Rico.  In Lajas, over 270 residences lost their roof. The hurricane destroyed Lajas' pineapple industry.

Geography

Lajas is located on the southern coast. Laguna Cartagena National Wildlife Refuge is a national protected area located in Lajas.

Barrios

Like all municipalities of Puerto Rico, Lajas is subdivided into barrios.

 Candelaria
 Costa
 Lajas
 Lajas barrio-pueblo
 Lajas Arriba
 Llanos
 Palmarejo
 Parguera
 París
 Plata
 Sabana Yeguas
 Santa Rosa

Sectors
Barrios (which are like minor civil divisions) and subbarrios, in turn, are further subdivided into smaller local populated place areas/units called sectores (sectors in English). The types of sectores may vary, from normally sector to urbanización to reparto to barriada to residencial, among others.

Special Communities

 (Special Communities of Puerto Rico) are marginalized communities whose citizens are experiencing a certain amount of social exclusion. A map shows these communities occur in nearly every municipality of the commonwealth. Of the 742 places that were on the list in 2014, the following barrios, communities, sectors, or neighborhoods were in Lajas: El Papayo, El Tendal, Sector Sabana Yeguas, La Haya, Las Cuevas, Los Jovillos, Maguayo, Piñalejos, and Tokio.

Demographics

Tourism
Lajas is famous for its main touristic attraction, Phosphorescent Bay (La Parguera), a place where bioluminescent dinoflagellates of different colors appear when the water moves. The origin of the colored lights is the object of many legends. Lajas is also a fishing town.

Landmarks and places of interest

There are 5 beaches in Lajas.
Some of the main attractions of Lajas are:
Cartagena Lagoon
Indian Museum
Old Train Station
Old Silver Mines
La Parguera
Lajeño Soldier Monument
Isla Magueyes
Isla Mata la Gata
Pineapple Processing Plant Ruins
Rosada Beach or Playita Rosada
Caracoles Beach
Caribe Fisheries
The Puerto Rico Alien Route, which is passes by a landing strip developed by a local from Lajas to welcome extraterrestrial landings.

Culture

Festivals and events
Lajas celebrates its patron saint festival in February. The  is a religious and cultural celebration that generally features parades, games, artisans, amusement rides, regional food, and live entertainment.

Other festivals and events celebrated in Lajas include:
Kite Festival – February / March
Festival de Pesca de la Aguja Azul – May
Pineapple Festival - May or June, where up to 50,000 people come for arts, crafts, music and 30,000 lbs. of pineapple
Fiesta de San Pedro Festival – June
Agriculture Fair or  – June / July
Christmas Parade and Artisans Fair – December

Government

Like all municipalities in Puerto Rico, Lajas is administered by a mayor. The current mayor is Jayson Martínez, from the New Progressive Party (PNP). Martínez was elected at the 2020 general election.

The city belongs to the Puerto Rico Senatorial district V, which is represented by two Senators. In 2012, Ramón Ruiz and Martín Vargas Morales, from the Popular Democratic Party, were elected as District Senators.

Transportation 
There are 5 bridges in Lajas.

Notable Lajeños
 Luis Aponte Martínez, Roman Catholic cardinal of the Archdiocese of San Juan
 Ulises Casiano, Roman Catholic bishop of the Diocese of Mayagüez
 Robinson Cancel, Major League Baseball player
 Jacobo Morales, actor and film director
 Jose "Joe" Basora, Puerto Rican Boxer
 Henry LaFont, Puuerto Rican comedian and lawyer

Symbols
Lajas  has an official flag and coat of arms.

Flag
The flag consists of three horizontal stripes; the top one is green, the center one is white and the bottom one is light yellow. A vertical white stripe down the left makes a white cross. In the center of the cross is a ripe yellow pineapple. The cross is surrounded by eleven gold stars; five in the top  part and six in the lower part of the cross, in the form of a circle.

Coat of arms
It is gold with a green band crossing it diagonally right to left; gold stands for the wealth of the land and green for the beauty of the valley, which is a gift from mother nature to Lajas. The band is adorned, at each end, with a pineapple bordered in gold and black. In the center of the band, also in gold, a marine shell. In the top left there is a red cardinal's hat and in the bottom a red anchor with green; the shield has a 3 tower castle, each one with two windows and a door. On the bottom, outside the shield, a banner with the inscription "Ciudad Cardenalicia" (Cardinality City). The banner and the inscription appear in black.

Gallery
Scenes around Lajas:

See also

List of Puerto Ricans
History of Puerto Rico
National Register of Historic Places listings in Lajas, Puerto Rico
Did you know-Puerto Rico?

References

External links
 Welcome to Puerto Rico! Lajas

 
Municipalities of Puerto Rico
Populated coastal places in Puerto Rico
Populated places established in 1883
San Germán–Cabo Rojo metropolitan area